The Geechee or Gullah are African Americans who live in the Lowcountry region of the U.S. states of Georgia, Florida, and South Carolina.

Geechee may also refer to:
 Geechee language or Gullah
 Gullah/Geechee Cultural Heritage Corridor or Geechee Territory
 Geechie or Geechee, an ethnocentric nickname
 Geechee (film), an American thriller film
 Geechee Recollections, a 1973 album by Marion Brown
 "Geechee", a 1982 song by Archie Shepp from Soul Song

See also

 Gullah (disambiguation)
 Ogeechee (disambiguation)